Malshej Ghat (माळशेज घाट) is a mountain pass located on Maharashtra's Kalyan–Ahmednagar Road in the Western Ghats range.

The site is home to hundreds of various species of flora and fauna, particularly avian species such as quails, rails, crakes, flamingos, and cuckoos.

Getting there
Malshej ghat, with an average height of 700 m, is located in the Pune district near the Thane district's boundary. It's 130 kilometres north of Pune and 154 kilometres northeast of Mumbai. Kalyan in Thane District or Karjat near Mumbai are the nearest rail stations. Junnar, Pune is the closest State Transport Bus Station. State buses run frequently between Kalyan and Ahmednagar and can be boarded at the Kalyan Rail Station. Next to the train station lies the State Bus Station. Any bus bound towards Ahmednagar will stop at Malshej Ghat. Taking the bus from Kalyan will take about 1.5 hours. To travel by road to Malshej ghat from Pune take the Pune-Nashik highway (NH-50) to Narayangaon, then turn left at Otur onto the Kalyan-Ahmednagar Highway (SH-222) towards Kalyan. From Mumbai take the NH3 to Bhiwandi and then turn towards Murbad or take the state highway through Kalyan, Murbad, Saralgaon, and Vaishakhare. Landslides are common during monsoons.

Birds
Malshej Ghat is well-known for its avian population, particularly flamingos are found here.they appear on the lake when monsoon begin,water level rises located downside the hills.

Around Malshej,Wildlife
One of the major attractions here is the view of the valleys. It is also known for its dark woods and the wildlife that inhabits them. Animals include tigers, leopards, rabbits, and peacocks. Khireshwar is a famous place near Malshej Ghat. From Khireshwar village, one can visit Harishchandragad. Many waterfalls can be found in the hilly areas and some along the highway.There are also many species of monkeys in the hills.commonly most of macaque monkeys are found here.

 Harishchandragad
 Pimpalgaon Joga Dam
 Malshej falls
 Shivneri Fort

Accommodation
Flamingo Hill is a resort run by MTDC - Maharashtra Tourism Development Corporation in the area.

Things To Do In Malshej Ghat
For outdoor enthusiasts and adventure seekers, there are hiking trails in the nearby hills, for nature lovers, there are gushing waterfalls and verdant flora and fauna to explore, and bird enthusiasts can marvel at the sight of pink flamingos that swoop down each year here between July and September.

Time To Visit
August and September are the best months to visit Malshej Ghat, with green hills and exotic flamingos visiting this area during this season.

See also
 Harishchandragad
 Shivneri

References

External links

 Malshej Ghat
 Junnar Tourism's Official Website
 Parashar Agritourism Website

Geography of Pune district
Tourist attractions in Thane district
Mountain passes of Maharashtra
Mountain passes of the Western Ghats